Champagne Charlie is a 1936 American drama film directed by James Tinling and starring Paul Cavanagh and Helen Wood.

Plot summary

"Champagne" Charlie Courtland (Paul Cavanaugh) is a smooth, sophisticated and highly unethical gambler, plying his trade among the rich and famous. Charlie's backers hope for a huge financial windfall when he begins to court beautiful young heiress Linda Craig (Helen Wood).

Cast
 Paul Cavanagh as Charlie Cortland
 Helen Wood as Linda Craig
 Thomas Beck as Tod Hollingsworth
 Minna Gombell as Lillian Wayne
 Herbert Mundin as Mr. James Augustus Fipps
 Noel Madison as Pedro Gorini
 Montagu Love as Ivan Suchine
 Delma Byron as Iris 
 Alan Edwards as Valaroff
 Madge Bellamy as Woman in Cab

References

External links 
 
 
 
 

1936 films
American black-and-white films
20th Century Fox films
1936 drama films
American drama films
Films scored by Samuel Kaylin
Films directed by James Tinling
1930s English-language films
1930s American films